David Hepher (born Surrey, England, 1935)  is a British artist, best known for his paintings of buildings, landscapes, especially tower blocks, including the Aylesbury Estate:

Early life
David Hepher was born in Surrey. He studied at Camberwell School of Art and then at Slade School of Art.

He later became a Senior lecturer in painting at Chelsea School of Art from 1981 to 1990. Since 2001 he became a professor and head of undergraduate painting at Slade School of Fine Art.

He bought a house in Camberwell Grove, England, in 1961 and has lived there ever since.

Career
His work lies in between conceptual and traditional.

His work has been exhibited in the Serpentine Gallery, Flowers Gallery, Mappin Art Gallery, Whitechapel Art Gallery, Hayward Gallery, Ikon Gallery and Tate Britain,.

He is featured in the two parts BBC Four documentary: "Bunkers, Brutalism, Bloodymindedness: Concrete Poetry", where he was interviewed by Jonathan Meades.

Collections

 Arts Council Collection
 Arrangement in Turquoise and Cream 1 1979–1981
 Five Working Drawings 1979–81
 Study for 'Arrangement in Turquoise and Cream 1981
 British Arts Council
 Study, 1993
 Number, 1972
 Bradford Museum and Art Gallery
 Windows of No. 19
 Museum Boymans-van Beuningen
 The Windows of Number 22
 Museum of London
 Camberwell Flats, (by day), 1983
 Camberwell Nocturne, 1984
 Tate Gallery
 Albany Flats, 1972
 Victoria and Albert Museum
 Camberwell Flats, 1984

Bibliography

Exhibition Catalogues
David Hepher: The Windows of the Brandon Estate – An Elegy to Tall Buildings [Catalogue of the exhibition held at Flowers East 1999] London.
David Hepher [Catalogue of the exhibition held at Flowers East 2002] London.
David Hepher [Catalogue of the exhibition held at Flowers East 2008] London.
Monographs
Lucie-Smith, E. (1996) David Hepher. Momentum, London.

References

External links
 Hepher at Kingsplace Gallery
 
 Hepher's studio in Camberwell, London
 Flowers Gallery

20th-century British painters
British male painters
21st-century British painters
1935 births
Living people
Alumni of Camberwell College of Arts
Date of birth missing (living people)
Academics of Camberwell College of Arts
20th-century British male artists
21st-century British male artists